Charles Michael Alexis Sola (born as Carlo Michele Alessio Sola, mostly known as "C.M. Sola") (6 June 1786 – 21 January 1857) was an Italian guitarist, flutist and composer, active in England after 1817.

Biography
Sola was born in Turin, where he studied the violin with Gaetano Pugnani, also the guitar (with Pipino) and flute (with Vondano), and played flute in the orchestra of the local Teatro Regio. His date of birth has recently been put into doubt; he may also have been born in either 1781 or in 1789. According to Bone, "he served four years on the band of the 73rd Regiment of French Infantry and tiring of a military life settled in 1809 in Geneva", where he also received tuition in composition from Dominique Bideau, a local cellist. 1816 saw the production of his opera Le Tribunal in Geneva.

After having published some of his music in Geneva and Paris, Sola moved to London in 1817, where he "numbered among his pupils members of the royal family". Sola was the author of a method for the guitar, Sola's Instructions for the Spanish Guitar, and published numerous works for guitar solo, duos for guitar and piano, songs with guitar accompaniment and also works for the flute. Many of his songs were arrangements of popular songs and opera arias of the time, often originally by English and Irish composers. Apparently, Sola has never left England and died there in 1857 from "heart and liver exhaustion" in his home at Gardener's Lane, Putney Hill.

Selected compositions
Sola's Instructions for the Spanish Guitar (London: Chappell, c.1827)

Bibliography
Philip J. Bone: The Guitar and Mandolin: Biographies of Celebrated Players and Composers for These Instruments (London: Schott and Augener, 1914)
Stewart W. Button: The Guitar in England, 1800–1924 (New York: Garland Publishing, 1989); i.e. Ph.D. dissertation of University of Surrey, 1984.

References

1786 births
1857 deaths
19th-century classical composers
19th-century Italian composers
19th-century Italian male musicians
Composers for the classical guitar
Italian classical composers
Italian classical guitarists
Italian emigrants to the United Kingdom
Italian male classical composers
Italian male guitarists
Musicians from Turin
19th-century guitarists